Granuloma fissuratum may refer to:

 Acanthoma fissuratum
 Epulis fissuratum

Epidermal nevi, neoplasms, and cysts
Conditions of the mucous membranes